Rajasthan Royals (RR) is a franchise cricket team based in Rajasthan, India, which has played in the Indian Premier League (IPL) since the first edition of the tournament in 2008. They were one of ten teams to compete in the 2022 Indian Premier League. The Royals have previously lifted the IPL title once, in the inaugural season.

The side finished as the runners-up in the season.

Background

The franchise chose to retain three players ahead of the 2022 mega-auction.

Retained Sanju Samson, Jos Buttler, Yashasvi Jaiswal 
Released Ben Stokes, Jofra Archer, Mahipal Lomror, Manan Vohra, Mayank Markande, Rahul Tewatia, Riyan Parag, Shreyas Gopal, Robin Uthappa, Jaydev Unadkat, Anuj Rawat, Kartik Tyagi, David Miller, Andrew Tye, Shivam Dube, Chris Morris, Mustafizur Rahman, Liam Livingstone, Chetan Sakariya, Kuldip Yadav, Akash Singh, K. C. Carriapa
Acquired at the auction Ravichandran Ashwin, Trent Boult, Devdutt Padikkal, Shimron Hetmyer, Prasidh Krishna, Yuzvendra Chahal, Riyan Parag, KC Cariappa, Navdeep Saini, Obed McCoy, Anunay Singh, Kuldeep Sen, Karun Nair, Dhruv Jurel, Tejas Baroka, Kuldip Yadav, Shubham Garhwal, James Neesham, Nathan Coulter-Nile, Rassie van der Dussen, Daryl Mitchell

Squad
 Players with international caps are listed in bold.

Administration and support staff

Kit manufacturers and sponsors

|

Teams and standings

Points table

Group fixtures

Playoffs

Preliminary

Qualifier 1

Qualifier 2

Final

Statistics

Most runs

 Last updated: 21 May 2022 
 Source: Cricinfo

Most wickets

 Last updated: 21 May 2022 
 Source: Cricinfo

Player of the match awards

References

External links
Official Website

2022 Indian Premier League
Rajasthan Royals seasons
2020s in Rajasthan
Cricket teams in India